Jerry Schmitt (born September 16, 1960) is an American football coach and former player.  He is currently the head coach at Duquesne University, a position he had held since the 2005 season.  Schmitt served as the head coach at Westminster College in New Wilmington, Pennsylvania from 2000 to 2004.  He is an alumnus of Westminster College, where he played as an offensive lineman on the football team.  Prior to receiving the head coach position at Westminster, Schmidt was an assistant at Duquesne and a high school football coach in Pennsylvania.

Head coaching record

College

References

External links
 Duquesne profile

1960 births
Living people
American football offensive linemen
Duquesne Dukes football coaches
Westminster Titans football coaches
Westminster Titans football players
High school football coaches in Pennsylvania
Sportspeople from Pittsburgh
Coaches of American football from Pennsylvania
Players of American football from Pittsburgh